Sefidaleh (also Romanized as Sefīdāleh) is a village in Dastjerd Rural District, Khalajastan District, Qom County, Qom Province, Iran. At the 2016 census, its population was 53, in 20 families. Most fruits of the village are pomegranates. But along with those fruits like blackberries and walnuts are also found. Villagers are engaged in construction and agriculture in the countryside.

The weather in the village is hot and dry in the summer, but it has a cool winter and a beautiful spring.

References 

Populated places in Qom Province